The Hunter-Coulter House is a historic house at the northern corner of 2nd and Commerce Streets in Ashdown, Arkansas.  It is a single-story wood-frame structure, with a gable roof, which extends over a full-width front porch supported by heavy wooden columns on brick piers.  The house is an example of American craftsman architecture, with exposed rafters and large knee brackets visible.  The house was built in 1918 for William Grant Hunter, during the building boom that followed the railroad's arrival in Ashdown.  It is one of the few residences in the county to survive from that period.

The house was listed on the National Register of Historic Places in 1996.

See also
National Register of Historic Places listings in Little River County, Arkansas

References

External links
 Hunter-Coulter Museum

Houses on the National Register of Historic Places in Arkansas
Houses completed in 1918
Houses in Little River County, Arkansas
Museums in Little River County, Arkansas
History museums in Arkansas
National Register of Historic Places in Little River County, Arkansas